Auto Driver is a 1998 Telugu film, produced by D. Siva Prasad Reddy under the Kamakshi Movies banner, directed by Suresh Krishna. It stars Nagarjuna, Deepti Bhatnagar and Simran, with music  composed by Deva. It was dubbed into Tamil as Autokaran. The film was a box office failure.

Plot
It tells the story of an importable auto driver who falls in love with a college student. They live happily until the girl's father rejects their love and a villain is also into the girl. Who is the villain and how the auto driver convinces the heroine's love to her father forms the rest of the story.

Cast

 Nagarjuna as Jagan, Auto Driver
 Deepti Bhatnagar as Sravani
 Simran as Sandhya
 Vijayakumar as Sravani's father
 Dara Singh as Guru
 Mahesh Anand as Surya
 Ajay Rathnam as Nagaraj
 Kolla Ashok Kumar as Sravani's father's PA
 Kota Srinivasa Rao as Auto Driver Saidul
 Brahmanandam as Auto Driver
 Sudhakar
 Babu Mohan as Mental patient / BPL Johnny, Bus driver
 M.S. Narayana
 AVS as Astrologer
 Rallapalli as Sravani's driver
 Rajiv Kanakala as Jagan's brother-in-law
 Ananth Babu as Ananth
 Gundu Hanumantha Rao as Auto Driver
 Kallu Chidambaram as Auto Driver
 Gautam Raju as Auto Driver
 Jenny as Doctor
 Sujatha as Jagan's mother
 Siva Pavathi
 Krishnasri

Soundtrack

Music was composed by Deva. Music was released on ADITYA Music Company.

References

External links

1998 films
Films directed by Suresh Krissna
Films scored by Deva (composer)
1990s Telugu-language films